Sika AG is a Swiss multinational specialty chemical company that supplies to the building sector and motor vehicle industry, headquartered in Baar, Switzerland. The company develops and produces systems and products for bonding, sealing, damping, reinforcing, and protecting. Currently, it has over 27,000 employees, subsidiaries in more than 100 countries, and an annual sales turnover of CHF 9.3 billion.

Sika was founded in 1910 when Kaspar Winkler laid the cornerstone for the firm. Winkler worked himself up from poverty to become a successful entrepreneur, and by the 1920s he was already engaged in founding subsidiaries abroad.

Besides the brand Sika, more than 900 product brands are in use including Sikaflex, SikaTack, Sika ViscoCrete, SikaBond, Sikafloor, Sika CarboDur Sikagard, Sika MaxTack, Sikaplan, Sikament, Sikadur, SikaLastic, SikaRoof MTC, Sika Unitherm and Sika Sarnafil.

In 2019, Sika acquired PAREX Group, a global company headquartered in France with more than 4,500 employees and 1,034 million € on revenues.

Sika AG is the legal entity for the holding company, which includes the Sika organizations worldwide, Sika Technology AG (Research and Development) and Sika Services AG (Corporate functions supporting all organizations worldwide).

History

1910 - 1950
 1910: Kaspar Winkler founded Sika: Winkler's first inventions were agents to protect and clean  granite (Conservado, Purigo) and a waterproofing agent for mortars. This waterproofing agent named Sika-1 is still sold today.
1912: Subsidiary founded: In Southern Germany, a subsidiary with its own, small-scale manufacturing facility was founded. Leadership capacity and connections were insufficient for determining expansion. By hiring a Director for Foreign Operations who cared about the Sika operations, more subsidiaries were founded in  England, Italy, and France.
1918: The Swiss Federal Railways ran successful trials:  The  Swiss Federal Railways ran successful trials using Sika to waterproof the tunnels of the Gotthard section. This became necessary so that electric trains could be used as well. The Swiss National Railways waterproofed 67 tunnels with Sika during the following years, which was Sika's breakthrough, as it represented Sika's first big reference project, a true landmark.
1935: Worldwide Presence:  Before  World War II Fritz Schenker, Winkler's son-in-law pushed the expansion in Europe, North- and South America, and in Asia.

1950 - 2000
1971: Second generation change: Romuald Burkard took over the leadership of the group of companies which by 1968 had become a single integral corporate structure with Sika Finanz AG. Subsequently, Sika was listed on the Swiss Stock Exchange.
1990: Weak Profitability: 1990s were not an easy decade for Sika AG. The solution to survive the difficult times was achieved by withdrawing from less lucrative, non-core businesses, such as the building of robots used to restore sewer lines. Sika also abandoned the manufacture of road building products. Sika came close to selling its sealing membranes business to Sarnafil.
2000: Core competencies: Sika summarizes its core competencies as follows: sealing, bonding, damping, reinforcing and protecting.

2000 - present
2009: Dubai Metro’s first line: The Dubai Metro's first line was inaugurated. The second line is scheduled to begin by operating in 2011. There are 58.7 km of overground track in tunnels clad with 53000 prefabricated tubbing elements.
2010: 100-year anniversary: Worldwide celebrations at the different subsidiaries with the attendance of the owner family, active and retired Senior Managers, and others. On the threshold of its 100-year anniversary, Sika starts running the platform  Sika Experiences which promotes internships and enables students and young professionals insights into this industry.
2012: A new president for the Board of Directors and a new CEO: Paul Hälg, CEO of the Dätwyler Gruppe, is elected as president of the Board of Directors of Sika AG. Jan Jenisch takes over the CEO position from Ernst Bärtschi upon his retirement on January 1, 2012.
2013: Target Markets & Regions: Sika defines its target markets as concrete, waterproofing, roofing, flooring, sealing and bonding, refurbishment and industry. The geographical regions are reduced from six to four: EMEA (Europe, Middle East, Africa), North America, Latin America and Asia/Pacific. The former regions Europe South and Europe North are incorporated in the new region EMEA. The region IMEA is dissolved and India is included in the region Asia/Pacific. The regional distinction is based on unified economic areas and supply chain structures.
 June 2013: Acquisition of Everbuild: Sika acquired Everbuild, the UK leading manufacturer of sealants and Adhesives.
 July 2013: Acquisition of membrane manufacturers: Sika acquired JMTexsa, S.A. de C.V. of Mexico and Texsa India Ltd. They are leading manufacturers of waterproofing membranes and will complement Sika's roofing product range.
2014: Further global growth: Six new subsidiaries opened in Sri Lanka, Bosnia-Herzegovina, Albania, Mozambique, Ivory Coast, and Nigeria, and eight new factories opened worldwide. Sustainability Reporting: Sika becomes one of the first companies in Switzerland to introduce Global Reporting Initiative G4 Standard Collaboration: Sika establishes a research group on Management in Emerging Markets with the University of Fribourg (Switzerland)
2015: Continuation of growth strategy: Acquisitions of Mozambique-based Douro-Moza, BMI Products of Northern California Inc., Axson technologies, Construction Technologies Australia Pty Ltd (CTA) and Addiment Italia. Establishment of national subsidiaries in Ethiopia and Tanzania. The mortar business - a core component of Sika's Strategy 2018- exhibited an above average performance, with sales growth of 12.9%
2017: Acquisition of Butterfield Color: Sika acquired Butterfield Color, a US-based market leader of decorative concrete floor products and systems.
2018: Continuation of growth strategy: Sika acquired Arcon Membrane Srl, Romania; Concrete Fibers Business of Propex Holding, LLC, USA; Polypag AG, Switzerland and Index Construction Systems and Products, Italy. 
2019: Acquisition of Parex: In May 2019, Sika acquired Parex, a global construction chemical company, which provides specialty solutions to the building and construction industry. Headquartered in France, Parex more than 4,500 employees and 1,034 million € on revenues.

References

External links
 Sika Worldwide Website
 Sika UK Website

Chemical companies of Switzerland
Chemical companies established in 1910
Paint manufacturers
Swiss brands
Swiss companies established in 1910
Companies listed on the SIX Swiss Exchange
Specialty chemical companies
Multinational companies headquartered in Switzerland